The 1967 Minnesota Golden Gophers football team represented the University of Minnesota in the 1967 Big Ten Conference football season. In their 14th year under head coach Murray Warmath, the Golden Gophers compiled an 8–2 record and outscored their opponents by a combined total of 163 to 106. The Gophers shared the Big Ten title, the most recent conference title for the University of Minnesota football team. 
 
Back Tom Sakal received the team's Most Valuable Player award. End Bob Stein was named an All-American by the Walter Camp Football Foundation, Associated Press, United Press International and Football Writers Association of America. Tackle John Williams, end Bob Stein, tackle McKinley Boston and back Tom Sakal were named All-Big Ten first team. Tight end Charles Sanders and offensive guard Ed Duren were named All-Big Ten second team. Offensive lineman Ezell Jones, defensive lineman Ron Kamzelski, defensive lineman Dave Nixon and defensive lineman Bob Stein were named Academic All-Big Ten.

Total attendance at six home games was 287,798, an average of 47,966 per game. The largest crowd was against Michigan State.

Schedule

References

Minnesota
Minnesota Golden Gophers football seasons
Big Ten Conference football champion seasons
Minnesota Golden Gophers football